Alicia Molik was the defending champion, but did not compete this year.

Katarina Srebotnik won the title by defeating Anastasia Myskina 7–5, 6–2 in the final.

Seeds

Draw

Finals

Top half

Bottom half

References
 ITF tournament profile

Singles
Nordea Nordic Light Open
Nordic